It's Not Over may refer to:

Songs
 "It's Not Over" (Daughtry song), 2006
 "It's Not Over" (Reba McEntire song), 1984, also recorded by Mark Chesnutt in 1992
 "It's Not Over" (Curtis Harding song), 2018
 "It's Not Over" (Rockmelons song), 1992
 "It's Not Over", 2007 song by Secondhand Serenade, from the album Awake
 "It's Not Over ('Til It's Over)", 1987 single by Starship, from the album No Protection

Albums
 It's Not Over (Luong Bich Huu album), 2008
 It's Not Over (Debelah Morgan album), 1998
 It's Not Over (Karen Clark Sheard album), 2006, and the title song
 It's Not Over (Shooting Star album), 1991
 It's Not Over, 1995 album by Bobby DeBarge, and the title song